Achaearanea hieroglyphica is a tangle web spider species found in Brazil, French Guiana and Peru.

See also 
 List of Theridiidae species

References

External links 

Theridiidae
Arthropods of Brazil
Fauna of French Guiana
Invertebrates of Peru
Spiders described in 1940
Spiders of South America